Crassispira erronea is an extinct species of sea snail, a marine gastropod mollusk in the family Pseudomelatomidae, the turrids and allies.

Description

Distribution
Fossils have been found in Eocene strata in Loire Atlantique, France.

References

 Cossmann (M.), 1902 - Mollusques éocèniques de la Loire-Inférieure. tome 2, fascicule 2. Bulletin de la Société des Sciences naturelles de l'Ouest de la France, sér. 2, t. 2, vol. 1, p. 5-159

erronea
Gastropods described in 1902